The 1914 Cornell Big Red football team represented Cornell University in the 1914 college football season.

Schedule

Gallery

References

Cornell
Cornell Big Red football seasons
Cornell Big Red football